The Diocese of Singapore is a diocese of the Province of the Anglican Church in South East Asia consisting of 27 Anglican parishes in Singapore and 6 deaneries throughout the Asia region. It has an established history of church-planting as well as providing educational, medical and social services in Singapore and the neighbouring region. The Diocese of Singapore is in communion with the See of Canterbury. St Andrew's Cathedral is the cathedral church of the diocese.

Currently, the diocese is headed by the Right Reverend Dr Titus Chung, who was preceded by the bishop and former vicar of St John's-St Margaret's Church, the Right Reverend Rennis Ponniah.

Coat of Arms

The coat of arms of the Diocese of Singapore which belongs to the category of ecclesiastical heraldry, consists of a mitre surmounted on a St Andrew's Shield. The mitre symbolises apostolic authority and divine endorsement to govern the Anglican diocese in the region. The crozier symbolises the bishop's episcopate and the key represents the access to heaven. Emblazoned upon the St Andrew's Shield are four bunches of wheat symbolising the harvest fields which God has entrusted to the diocese.

History

The Anglican Community in Singapore has its roots in 1826, shortly after the founding of modern Singapore by Sir Stamford Raffles in 1819 and the arrival of the first English settlers from the British East India Company.

Raffles allocated a piece of land between Hill Street and North Bridge Road in his Town Plan of 1822 for the siting of an Anglican church. However, construction of the church did not begin until funds were raised by the community in 1834. The church was named Saint Andrew after the patron saint of Scotland in honour of the Scottish community who had donated to the building fund.

After falling under jurisdiction of the bishop of Labuan and Sarawak (and no longer Calcutta) in 1869, St. Andrew's Cathedral was made the cathedral church of the diocese in 1870. Officially titled Diocese of Singapore, Labuan and Sarawak in 1881, a diocese over such a large area was quite unmanageable. In 1909 Singapore was made a separate diocese covering the Straits Settlements, Peninsular Malaya, Siam, Java, Sumatra and adjacent islands, with Bishop Charles J. Ferguson-Davie as the first bishop of the diocese. On 6 February 1960, it was renamed to Diocese of Singapore and Malaya. On 8 April 1970, the diocese was dissolved and split into Diocese of Singapore and Diocese of West Malaysia.

In 1996, the autocephalous Church of the Province of South East Asia (the "Province") consisting of the Dioceses of Singapore, West Malaysia, Kuching and Sabah was established by the then-Archbishop of Canterbury, George Carey. Moses Tay, Bishop of Singapore, was installed as the first Metropolitan Archbishop of the Province the same year.

The Province, which celebrated its 20th Anniversary in February 2016, declared itself to be in impaired communion with the Episcopal Church (previously Episcopal Church of the United States of America or ECUSA) following the consecration of Bishop Gene Robinson in 2003.  In 2018, the Province recognised the Anglican Church in North America (“ACNA”) as a fellow Anglican province and declared itself to be in full communion with the clergy of ACNA.

The ACNA advocates strict adherence to an orthodox Anglican theology based on the traditional doctrinal statement of Anglicanism in the Thirty-nine Articles of Religion of 1571 and stipulates that these be “taken in their literal and grammatical sense”.  In the installation of Titus Chung as the 10th Anglican Bishop of Singapore, the  bells at St Andrew’s Cathedral – where the consecration and enthronement service took place – were rung 39 times to symbolise the Thirty-nine Articles of Religion of the Anglican Church.

List of Bishops
 The Right Revd George Frederick Hose, Bishop of Singapore, Labuan & Sarawak (1881–)
 The Right Revd Charles James Ferguson-Davie (1909–)
 The Right Revd Basil Colby Roberts (1927–)
 The Right Revd John Leonard Wilson (1941–)
 The Right Revd of Henry Wolfe Baines (1949–)
 The Right Revd Cyril Kenneth Sansbury (1961–)
 The Right Revd Joshua Chiu Ban It (1966–)
 The Right Revd Dr Moses Tay Leng Kong (1982–)
 The Right Revd Dr John Chew Hiang Chea (2000–)
 The Right Revd Rennis Ponniah (2012–)
 The Right Revd Dr Titus Chung (2020–)

Parishes
As of 2018, there are 27 Anglican parishes in the diocese:
St Andrew's Cathedral
All Saints' Church
Chapel of Christ the King
Chapel of Christ the Redeemer
Chapel of the Holy Spirit
Chapel of the Resurrection
Church of Our Saviour
Church of the Ascension
Church of the Epiphany
Church of the Good Shepherd
Church of the True Light
Holy Trinity Parish
Light of Christ Church Woodlands
Marine Parade Christian Centre
My Saviour's Church
Parish of Christ Church (Tamil)
St Andrew’s City Church
St Andrew's Community Chapel
St George's Church
St Hilda's Church
St James' Church
St John's Chapel
St John's–St Margaret's Church
St Matthew's Church
St Paul's Church
St Peter's Church
Yishun Christian Church (Anglican)

Deaneries
There are six deaneries in the Diocese of Singapore:
Cambodia
Laos
Indonesia
Nepal
Thailand
Vietnam

A dean oversees the mission work in each deanery and regularly reports to the director of missions of the Diocese of Singapore.

Schools
Anglican schools in Singapore:
Anglican High School
Christ Church Secondary School
Saint Hilda's Primary School
Saint Hilda's Secondary School
St. Margaret's Primary School
St. Margaret's Secondary School
Saint Andrew's Junior School
St. Andrew's Secondary School
St. Andrew's Junior College
St. Andrew's Autism School

Additionally, there are five kindergartens and six childcare centres as of 2020:

Kindergartens
 Ascension Kindergarten
 Queenstown Good Shepherd Kindergarten
 St. Hilda's Kindergarten
 St. James' Church Kindergarten
 St. Paul's Church Kindergarten

Childcare Centres
 Ascension Kindercare – A Little Seeds Preschool
 Kiddy Ark Kindercare – A Little Seeds Preschool
 Praiseland Kindercare – A Little Seeds Preschool
 Sonshine Kindercare – A Little Seeds Preschool
 St. Andrew's Kindercare – A Little Seeds Preschool
 St. James' Kindercare – A Little Seeds Preschool

Medical services

The St Andrew's Mission Hospital (SAMH) is a non-profit voluntary welfare organisation under the Diocese of Singapore. It is the corporate headquarters that oversees several medical arms:
St Andrew's Community Hospital, located at Simei Street 3 with over 100 beds
St Andrew's Autism Centre
St Andrew's Senior Care which provides eldercare services at four centres island-wide
St Andrew's Mission Hospital Clinic, a primary care clinic in Simei and Elliot Road
St Andrew's Lifestreams, located at St Andrew's Village, this Centre provides counselling services primarily for Anglican schools
St Andrew's Nursing Home

See also

Church of the Province of South East Asia
Church of England
Bishop of Singapore
Christ Church Bangkok
Singapore and West Malaysia Diocesan Association

References

External links

St Andrew's Cathedral
Anglican Communion official website

Singapore
Singapore
Anglicanism in Singapore